Aphaenops alberti is a species of beetle in the subfamily Trechinae. It was described by Jeannel in 1939.

References

alberti
Beetles described in 1939